= M. A. Maryasin =

M. A. Maryasin was a Soviet politician, who served as People's Commissar of Social Security of the Byelorussian SSR from 1921 to 1924.
